Querco is a town and the capital city of the Querco District, a district of the Huaytará province in Peru. This town is in a remote place. The people there own bulls, ducks, sheep, dogs, pigs, and cattle.

References

Populated places in the Huancavelica Region